Sergeyevo is a rural locality (a village) in Paustovskoye Rural Settlement, Vyaznikovsky District, Vladimir Oblast, Russia. The population was 540 as of 2010. There are 7 streets.

Geography 
Sergeyevo is located 10 km south of Vyazniki (the district's administrative centre) by road. Tsentralny is the nearest rural locality.

References 

Rural localities in Vyaznikovsky District